Onkelos ( ʾunqəlōs), possibly identical to Aquila of Sinope, was a Roman national who converted to Judaism in Tannaic times ( 35–120 CE). He is considered to be the author of the Targum Onkelos ( 110 CE).

In the Talmud
Onkelos is mentioned several times in the Talmud. According to the traditional Jewish sources, he was a prominent Roman nobleman, the son of a man named Callinicus ( Qəlūnīqūs or קַלִינִיקוּס Qalīnīqūs) and the brother of Titus, the Roman emperor. According to the midrash Tanhuma, he was a nephew of Hadrian, and not Titus. Neither of these assertions are historical — Hadrian's sister, his only sibling, had a daughter, and the only known child of either of Titus' siblings to survive to adulthood was also a girl, later known as Saint Flavia Domitilla. Nevertheless, the story goes that his uncle, the emperor, advised Onkelos to go out and find something that wasn't worth much today but would be invaluable in the future. Onkelos found Judaism.

Onkelos' conversion is the subject of a story wherein he first consulted with the spirits of three deceased enemies of Israel to see how Israel fared in the next world. The first was his uncle Titus, who was blamed for the destruction of the Second Temple; the second was the seer Balaam, hired by Balak king of Moab to curse Israel; and the last was Yeshu, a name used for those who sought to lead Jews astray to idolatry, in particular an idolatrous former student of Joshua ben Perachiah in the Hasmonean period as well as Manasseh of Judah. (In later writings Yeshu is used for Jesus, but opinions differ over whether it can be understood this way in the Talmud.) Onkelos is said to have seen all of them subjected to humiliating punishments for harming Israel. The earlier Jerusalem Talmud gives the subject of these stories as Aquilas the proselyte, often understood as being a person other than Onkelos. The difficulty with this theory, however, is that the Jerusalem Talmud says explicitly that he (Aquilas the proselyte) translated the Torah under Eliezer ben Hurcanus and Joshua ben Hananiah. The Babylonian Talmud repeats the same oral tradition, but this time calls him by the name Onkelos the proselyte, which leads one to conclude that the name is a mere variant of Aquila, applied in error to the Aramaic instead of the Greek translation. This view is supported by Epiphanius of Salamis (4th century).

After his conversion, the Talmud records a story of how the Roman emperor tried to have Onkelos arrested. Onkelos cited verses from the Tanakh to the first Roman contubernium, who then converted. The second contubernium was also converted, after he juxtaposed God's personal guidance of Israel in the Book of Numbers to the Roman social hierarchy. A similar tactic was used for the third contubernium, where Onkelos compared his mezuzah to a symbol of God guarding the home of every Jew, in contrast to a Roman king who has his servants guard him. The third contubernium also converted and no more were sent.

The Targum of Onkelos

According to tradition, Onkelos authored the Targum Onkelos as an exposition of the "official" interpretation of the peshat (or basic meaning) of the Torah as received by rabbis Eliezer ben Hurcanus and Joshua ben Hananiah. This helped canonise the status of both Onkelos and his Targum in the Jewish tradition.

See also
Targum
Targum Pseudo-Jonathan

References

External links

Biography of Onkelos from the Orthodox Union
Onkelos by Nissan Mindel from Chabad.org

1st-century births
2nd-century deaths
Ancient Pontic Greeks
Bible translators
Converts to Judaism from paganism
Mishnah rabbis
Translators of the Bible into Aramaic
2nd-century Romans
1st-century rabbis
2nd-century rabbis
Place of birth unknown